Mamadou Doumbia (born 3 December 1980) is an Ivorian former professional footballer who played as a defender.

Career
Born in Abidjan, Doumbia began his career with Académie de Sol Beni and was promoted to ASEC Mimosas in winter 1999–2000. In July 2006 he signed for FC Istres while a transfer fee of €350,000 was paid to ASEC Mimosas. After a six-year stint with Istres, he moved to Ligue 2 rivals Le Mans on 22 June 2011.

External links
 
 

Living people
1980 births
Footballers from Abidjan
Ivorian footballers
Ivory Coast international footballers
Association football defenders
FC Istres players
ASEC Mimosas players
Al-Arabi SC (Kuwait) players
Le Mans FC players
CA Bastia players
Championnat National players
Ligue 2 players
Ivorian expatriate footballers
Ivorian expatriate sportspeople in France
Ivorian expatriate sportspeople in Kuwait
Expatriate footballers in France
Expatriate footballers in Kuwait
Kuwait Premier League players